Glór Tíre ("voice of the country") is a reality-based talent search for Ireland's newest country and western music star. It has been running for a number of seasons on TG4, the Irish public service broadcaster for Irish-language speakers. It is produced by Gaelmedia for TG4. It is one of TG4's top rated programmes often coming first in the channels top 10 programmes, averaging 100,000 viewers.

Format
It is Ireland's only TV talent quest for country and western talent. It is presented by Aoife Ní Thuairisg. She talks to the contestants after they perform to get their reactions to the comments of studio judges.

Each series typically comprises 15 episodes. The opening episode introduces each of the artists to the audience, allowing them to sing a song for the judges and the audience. Over a span of nine concert programmes recorded as live, the contestants take their place beside their mentor over the course of one concert each. Each contestant performs a duet and a solo with their mentor within their concert programme. This is followed by a review edition recapping performances. Three elimination programmes follow with each session resulting in elimination of two contestants per week. The judging panel can save one of the three contestants with the lowest vote but the public vote is hugely important too. The grand final features three contestants and the winner is decided by public vote.

Winners

Season 1 (2003):
Season 2 (2004): Patrick Connolly
Season 4 (2006): Mark Prouse
Season 5 (2009): Patrick O'Sullivan
Season 6 (2010): Eunice Moran
Season 7 (2011): Nicky Kealey
Season 8 (2012):
Season 9 (2013): Michael Regan
Season 10 (2014): Michael Collins
Season 11 (2015): Liam Kelly
Season 12 (2016): Gavin McAloon
Season 13 (2017): Lauren McCrory
Season 14 (2018): Gary Fitzpatrick
Season 15 (2019): John Rafferty
Season 16 (2020): Paschal McAnenly
Season 17 (2021): Emma Donohue
Season 18 (2022): Aishling Rafferty

References

External links
TG4 website: Home page
Facebook

Irish talent shows
Irish variety television shows
TG4 original programming